"Let It Shine" was the last single released from Agnetha Fältskog's third English language solo album I Stand Alone.

The single was remixed in Sweden by Johan Ekelund.

The single did not chart in most countries except portions of Sweden and Denmark, and was the last single Fältskog had released in the 1980s.

Formats and track listings
The song was released in various formats with several versions of this song:
7"-single
 "Let It Shine" [Album Version] 4:00
 "Maybe It Was Magic" 4:10
7"-remix single
 "Let It Shine [Remixed Version] 3:32
 "Maybe It Was Magic" 4:10
12"-single
 "Let It Shine" [Extended Version] 5:30
 "Let It Shine" [Album Version] 4:00
 "Maybe It Was Magic" 4:10
12"-single (only released in the UK)
 "Let It Shine" [Bright-Remix] 3:51
 "Let It Shine" [Album Version] 4:00
 "Maybe It Was Magic" 4:10
Cassette single (only released in the USA)
 "Let It Shine" [Album Version] 3:58
 "Maybe It Was Magic" 4:07
3"-CD-single (only released in Japan)
 "Let It Shine" [Album Version]
 "Maybe It Was Magic"

External links
"Let It Shine" Official Agnetha Fältskog fan website

1988 singles
Agnetha Fältskog songs
Songs written by Bill LaBounty
1987 songs
Songs written by Austin Roberts (singer)